John E. Thrasher (born December 18, 1943) is a former state legislator, businessman, lawyer and lobbyist who served as the 15th President of Florida State University. He was approved by the Florida Board of Governors on November 6, 2014 and took office on November 10, 2014. On September 11, 2020, Thrasher and the university Board of Trustees announced his retirement in a joint statement. In May 2021, Richard McCullough was chosen by Florida State University’s Board of Trustees to succeed Thrasher.

Early life and education 
John Thrasher grew up in Jacksonville, Florida and earned his bachelor's degree in business from Florida State University in 1965. As an undergraduate, he was a member of Sigma Phi Epsilon fraternity. After college, he joined the United States Army, serving first in Germany, where he received the Army Commendation Medal, and later in Vietnam, where he was awarded two Bronze Stars. Thrasher attained the rank of captain before his honorable discharge in 1970. He returned to Tallahassee and earned a law degree with honors from the Florida State University College of Law in 1972.

Political career

Thrasher began his political career in 1986 with his election to the Clay County School Board. He served as vice chairman, then chairman of the board before running for the Florida House of Representatives. He was elected in 1992 and was re-elected without opposition in 1994, 1996 and 1998. In 2009, he was elected to the Florida Senate in a special election to represent the 8th District, which included parts of Duval, Flagler, Nassau, St. Johns and Volusia Counties.
After redistricting in 2012, he represented the 6th District which included all of St. Johns, Flagler, Putnam Counties, as well as parts of Volusia County.

Speaker of the Florida House of Representatives
On November 17, 1998, Thrasher was unanimously elected as Speaker of the House for the 1999 through 2000 term, which passed legislation including "Three Strikes, You're Out", "10-20-Life", "A+ Education Plan", and the largest tax cut in Florida history. Thrasher was cited on two separate occasions for violating Florida state ethics laws during and following his terms as a state representative. He was fined for both violations.

Political Campaigns
On September 15, 2009, Thrasher won the special Republican Primary election to succeed the late Senator Jim King. Thrasher defeated Ponte Vedra political activist Dan Quiggle, Jacksonville City Councilman Art Graham and former House Member Stan Jordan by garnering 39% or 13,247 votes in a four-way race.  Thrasher later claimed official victory after the General Election on October 6, 2009.

In 2010, Thrasher defeated Charles Perniciaro, M.D. in the Republican Primary by a vote of 61.8% to 38.2% and later Democrat Deborah Gianoulis, a retired television anchor, by a vote of 60.01% to 39.93% in the General Election on November 2, 2010.

Florida Senate
While in the Florida Senate, Thrasher served as the Chairman of the Rules Committee and the Vice-Chair of the Budget Subcommittee on Higher Education Appropriations.  Additionally, he served on the Budget, Budget Subcommittee on Criminal and Civil Justice Appropriations, Community Affairs, Judiciary, Reapportionment, Regulated Industries, and Rules Subcommittee on Ethics and Elections.

Chairman of the Republican Party of Florida

Within weeks of the resignation of disgraced chairman Jim Greer, Thrasher was recruited to be the next chair. With the backing of his longtime ally, former Governor Jeb Bush, he won easily his election to become the next Chairman of the Republican Party of Florida and promised to improve transparency, communications and relationships with party activists, and to raise $1 million in six weeks. However he was criticized for signing a secret severance agreement for Jim Greer, who subsequently went to prison.

Under Thrasher's leadership, the party raised $54.7 million, easily topping the $50.8 million raised during the three Greer years and helped deliver a slew of victories at the ballot box.

Under his tenure, the party swept the Florida Cabinet races, picked up four U.S. House seats, won a U.S. Senate race and delivered a two-thirds majority in the Legislature. It also survived a nasty gubernatorial primary and won a tight victory in the general election.

President of Florida State University

On April 2, 2014, Eric J. Barron assumed the presidency of Pennsylvania State University after serving as FSU's President for four years. He was succeeded by the university's provost, Garnett S. Stokes. In September 2014, Thrasher was appointed by the board of trustees of Florida State University by a vote of 11–2 to become the institution's 15th President. The appointment was approved by the Florida Board of Governors on November 6, 2014. On March 17, 2015, he was formally confirmed to the position at an investiture ceremony held at the school. Thrasher is an alumnus of Florida State University.

References

External links 
 Florida State University Office of the President Website
 Project Vote Smart – Senator John Thrasher (FL) profile
 

|-

|-

|-

|-

|-

1943 births
Republican Party members of the Florida House of Representatives
Republican Party Florida state senators
Florida State University alumni
Florida State University College of Law alumni
Lawyers from Columbia, South Carolina
School board members in Florida

Speakers of the Florida House of Representatives
Living people
Politicians from Columbia, South Carolina
Military personnel from South Carolina
Stetson University alumni
State political party chairs of Florida